John Murry Mitchell (March 18, 1858 – May 31, 1905) was a U.S. Representative from New York.

Early life 
Born in New York City, Mitchell attended Leggett's School at New York City. In 1877, he was graduated from Columbia College, New York City, where he was a member of St. Anthony Hall, in 1877. He graduated from the Columbia Law School and in 1879.

Career 
He was admitted to the bar in 1879 and practiced in New York City.

He successfully contested as a Republican the election of James J. Walsh to the Fifty-fourth Congress. He was reelected to the Fifty-fifth Congress and served from June 2, 1896, to March 3, 1899. He was an unsuccessful candidate for reelection in 1898 to the Fifty-sixth Congress.

He resumed the practice of law.

Personal 
He died in Tuxedo Park, New York, May 31, 1905.He was interred in Greenwood Cemetery, Brooklyn, New York.

His brother was assemblyman and U.S. Attorney for the Southern District of New York Edward Mitchell.

References

Sources

1858 births
1905 deaths
Columbia College (New York) alumni
Burials at Green-Wood Cemetery
Republican Party members of the United States House of Representatives from New York (state)
19th-century American politicians